Ophioderma falcatum is known as puapua moa or laukahi in Hawaii. It is a fern in the family Ophioglossaceae, and many people still classify it as an Ophioglossum.  Some consider it a subspecies of Ophioderma pendulum.  An epiphyte, it is native to the Hawaiian islands except for Ni'ihau and Kaho'olawe.  It also grows on some other Pacific islands.

References

Ophioglossaceae
Native ferns of Hawaii
Flora of Hawaii
Epiphytes